
The Tunjur (or Tungur) people are a Sunni Muslim ethnic group living in eastern Chad and western Sudan. In the 21st century, their number has been estimated at 175.000 people.

History 
Based on linguistic and archaeological evidence, the ethnic ancestry of the Tunjur people has been argued by contemporary archaeologist Claude Rilly to go back to a Nubian Christian past. Thus, Rilly claims that the name Tunjur goes back to the town of Dongola (Tungul or Old Dongola, where Tungur name is derived from Tungul, the old name of Dongola) in Nubia. According to their own oral traditions and other scholars, they are of Arab descent, whose ancestors migrated from the Arabian Peninsula to central Sudan either by way of North Africa and Tunis or by way of Nubia. Thus, the 19th century German explorer Gustav Nachtigal claimed they resemble Arabs in features and behaviour, but this impression has been refuted by modern scholars.

Although a minority, the Tunjur became the ruling class of Darfur and Wadai in the 13th century by peacefully taking over power from the Daju. In the 16th century, they were overthrown by an Arab group that founded the Keira dynasty, and later merged with the Fur people. According to the local legends of the Fur people, Shau Dorshid, the last ruler of the Tunjur, was “driven out by his own people because he compelled his subjects to dig wells in the high rocky regions and to undertake the ardeous and useless task of levelling the Mail mountain peak, on the summit of which he wanted to establish his residence." His capital was at the site of Ain Farah, where specimens of Christian iconography were found.

About the middle of the 17th century, the Tunjur people were expelled from the Islamic Wadai empire by Abd-el-Kerim of the Bargo people, and the Bargo controlled the slave supply caravans to the north. The Tunjur then migrated west to their current location. Thereafter, they converted to Maliki fiqh of Sunni Islam.

Society
The Tunjur are farmers and live closely associated with the Fur. Their own Tunjur language has become extinct, and they now speak Chadian Arabic, Fur, or Bari as their first language.

Contemporary issues
Following the Darfur conflict in February 2003, and like the Fur and the Zaghawa, many Tunjur also have been affected by fighting and persecution. A number of Tunjur have taken part in the fight against the Sudanese government under the banners of the Sudan Liberation Movement (SLM).

See also 
 History of Darfur
 Ouaddai Empire
 Tunjur kingdom

References

Bibliography 
 Arkell, A. J. "A History of Darfur. Part II: The Tunjur etc.", Sudan Notes and Records, 32, 2 (1951), 207-238.
 Balfour Paul, H. G. 1955. History and Antiquities of Darfur. Khartoum, Sudan Antiquities Service.
 Braukämper, Ulrich: Migration und ethnischer Wandel, Stuttgart, 1992.
 Fuchs, Peter: "The Arab origin of the Tunjur, in: A. Rouand (ed.), Les orientalistes sont des aventuriers, Saint-Maur, 1999, 235-9.
 
 Lange, Dierk: “Abwanderung der assyrischen tamkāru nach Nubien, Darfur und ins Tschadseegebiet“, in: Bronislaw Nowak et al. (eds.), Europejczycy Afrykanie Inni: Studia ofiarowane Profesorowi Michalowi Tymowskiemu, Warzawa 2011, 199-226. 
 Nachtigal, Gustav, transl. H. Fisher, Sahara and Sudan, vol. IV (vol. III, 1889), London 1971.
 Nave, Ari (2010). Tunjur. In Henry Louis Gates, Jr. and Kwame Anthony Appiah (eds.) Encyclopedia of Africa. Oxford University Press.
 O'Fahey, R. S. The Tunjur: a central Sudanic mystery. Sudan Notes and Records, vol. 61 (1980), pp. 47-60
 O'Fahey, R. S. The Darfur Sultanate: A History, London 2008.

Ethnic groups in Sudan
Ethnic groups in Chad
Darfur
Muslim communities in Africa